The following is a list of original programs of Czech Television network.

Series 
 4teens (2011)
 Ach, ty vraždy! (2010–2012)
 Bohéma (2017)
 Božena  (2021)
 Boží mlýny (2011)
 Bylo nás šest (1994)
 Cirkus Bukowsky (2013–2014)
 Clona (2014)
 Cukrárna (2011)
 Čapkovy kapsy (2011)
 Černá sanitka (2008)
 Černí baroni (2004)
 České století (2013)
 Četnické humoresky (1997–2007)
 Četníci z Luhačovic (2017)
 Čtvrtá hvězda (2014)
 Dabing Street (2018)
 Devadesátky (2022)
 Dobrá čtvrť (2005–2008)
 Dobré ráno, Brno! (Since 2023)
 Dobrodružství kriminalistiky (1989–1994)
 Docent (Since 2023)
 Doktor Martin (2015–2018)
 Ďáblova lest (2009)
 Ententýky (2012)
 Hlava Medúzy (2021)
 Hraběnky (2007)
 Inspektor Max (2018)
 Inženýrská odysea (1979–2006)
 Jak si nepodělat život (2019)
 Já, Mattoni (2016)
 Josef a Ly (2004)
 Kancl (2014)
 Kosmo (2016)
 Kriminálka Staré Město (2010–2013)
 Kukačky (Since 2021)
 Lovec (TBA)
 Lynč (2018)
 Maharal – Tajemství talismanu (2007)
 Marta a Věra (2014–2016)
 Mazalové (2014–2017)
 Místo zločinu České Budějovice (Since 2023)
 Místo zločinu Ostrava (2020)
 Místo zločinu Plzeň (2015)
 Modré stíny (2016)
 Most! (2019)
 Na cestě (Since 2006)
 Nádraží (2017)
 Náměstíčko (2004)
 Nemocnice na kraji města po dvaceti letech (2003–2004)
 Nemocnice na kraji města – nové osudy (2008)
 Neviditelní (2014)
 Nevinné lži (2013–2014)
 Ochránce (2021)
 Oktopus (TBA)
 Osada (Since 2021)
 Pět mrtvých psů (2016)
 Podezření (2022)
 Poldové a nemluvně (2020)
 Poste restante (2010)
 Pozadí událostí (2022)
 Proč bychom se netopili
 První republika (2014–2018)
 Případ pro exorcistu (2015)
 Případy 1. oddělení (2014–2022)
 Přítelkyně z domu smutku (1992)
 Ranč U Zelené sedmy (1998–2005)
 Rapl (2016–2019)
 Reportérka (2015)
 Rédl (2018)
 Rudyho má každý rád (2015)
 Staturnin (1994)
 Spravedlnost (2017)
 Stíny v mlze (Since 2022)
 Stockholmský syndrom (2020)
 Strážce duší (2003–2008)
 Strážmistr Topinka (2019)
 Svět pod hlavou (2017)
 Škola Na Výsluní (2006)
 Špunti na cestě (2022)
 Tajemství rodu (2013–2015)
 Trapný padesátky (2017)
 Trpaslík (2016–2017)
 Tři králové (1998)
 Ultimátum (2022)
 Území bílých králů (1991)
 Volha (Since 2023)
 Vyprávěj (2009–2013)
 Vzteklina (2018)
 Zdivočelá země (1997–2012)
 Zločiny Velké Prahy (2021)
 Znamení koně (2011–2015)
 Zrádci (2020)
 Ztracená brána (2012)
 Živé terče (2019)
 Život a doba soudce A. K. (2014–2017)

Quiz shows 
 AZ-kvíz

Award shows
 Český Lev
 Peče celá země
 Věříš si?
 StarDance

News 
 Branky, body, vteřiny
 Události

Reality shows 
Holiday in the Protectorate

Hobby-related shows
 Auto Moto Revue
 Auto Moto Styl
 Kluci v akci

Publicistic shows 
 13. komnata
 168 hodin
 Černé ovce
 Experiment
 Fokus Václava Moravce
 Kalendárium
 Reportéři ČT
 Toulavá kamera

Comedial shows 
 3 plus 1 s Miroslavem Donutilem (2004-2010)
 Česká soda (1993–1997)
 Pečený sněhulák (2014)
 Tak neváhej a toč! (1995–2007)
 Televarieté (1971–1998)

Talk show 
 Banánové rybičky
 Otázky Václava Moravce
 Všechnopárty

Other shows
 Největší Čech

References

Czech Television